The Third Baptist Church in Nashville, Tennessee, which has also been known as Hopewell Missionary Baptist Church and Parsonage, is a historic church at 906 and 908 Monroe Street.

It was added to the National Register of Historic Places in 1979.

It was designed by Swiss-born architect Henry Gibel (1859-1906).

References

Baptist churches in Tennessee
Churches on the National Register of Historic Places in Tennessee
Churches in Nashville, Tennessee
National Register of Historic Places in Nashville, Tennessee